Aya de Leon (born 1967) is an American novelist and activist who teaches at the University of California Berkeley. She first came to national attention as a spoken-word artist in the underground poetry scene in the San Francisco Bay Area, and a hip-hop theater artist. de Leon is of Puerto Rican, African-American, and West Indian heritage, and much of her work explores issues of race, gender, socio-economic class, body, nation and the climate crisis.

Early life

De Leon was born in Los Angeles in 1967, she is the daughter of Taj Mahal (musician) and his first wife, Anna de Leon.

Career

De Leon attended Harvard University, where she received a Bachelor of Arts. After, she returned to the Bay Area and began to perform spoken word, she won a spot on the San Francisco Slam Team (they won the Western Region Poetry Slam in 2000). From 1998 to 2008 she toured extensively as an independent artist. In 2001, she began to develop the hip-hop theater show Thieves in the Temple: The Reclaiming of Hip Hop, focused on fighting sexism and consumerism in hip hop  She began her college teaching career at Stanford University in 2001. In 2006, she was chosen as the Director of June Jordan's Poetry for the People at UC Berkeley, where she currently teaches poetry and spoken word. She earned her Master of Fine Arts in fiction from Antioch University Los Angeles.

From 1995 to 2009, her work was published in various print journals and anthologies, including Essence Magazine. 

In 2009, she stopped touring to start a family and transition to being a novelist. In 2013 she began to blog and to write for various online outlets, such as Harper's Bazaar, xojane, Bitch Magazine, Ebony, Racialicious, Writers Digest, Fusion, Womans Day, Movement Strategy Center, and The Feminist Wire. In 2014 she secured representation with literary agent Jenni Ferrari Adler of Union Literary in NYC. In 2015, she sold her debut book, a feminist heist novel with a Latina Robin Hood protagonist in a two-book deal to Kensington Books in New York. Her first novel, Uptown Thief, was published in 2016, the first of the "Justice Hustlers" series, which has been optioned for TV. Aya is working on the pilot.

Books
puffy, 2013
Uptown Thief, 2016
The Boss, 2017
The Accidental Mistress, 2018
Side Chick Nation, 2019
Equality Girls and the Purprle Reflecto-Ray, 2020 (self-published)
A Spy In The Struggle, 2020
Queen of Urban Prophecy, 2021
The Mystery Woman in Room Three, 2021 (serially published)
Undercover Latina, 2022

References

External links
 Aya de Leon official website

1967 births
Living people
Harvard University alumni
American women poets
American women novelists
University of California, Berkeley College of Letters and Science faculty
Antioch University alumni
Stanford University faculty
20th-century American poets
20th-century American women writers
21st-century American poets
21st-century American novelists
21st-century American women writers
Writers from Los Angeles